is a passenger railway station  located in the city of Yonago, Tottori Prefecture, Japan. It is operated by the West Japan Railway Company (JR West).

Lines

Station layout
There is no station building and the station is unattended.

History
Sambommatsuguchi Station opened on 1 November 1987.

Passenger statistics
In fiscal 2018, the station was used by an average of 392 passengers daily.

Surrounding area
Yonago Municipal Gotogaoka Junior High School
Yonago Municipal Sumiyoshi Elementary School

See also
List of railway stations in Japan

References

External links 

  Sambommatsuguchi Station from JR-Odekake.net 

Railway stations in Japan opened in 1987
Railway stations in Tottori Prefecture
Stations of West Japan Railway Company
Yonago, Tottori